Anos is a commune in the Pyrénées-Atlantiques department in the Nouvelle-Aquitaine region of southwestern France. It is part of the urban area (aire d'attraction des villes) of Pau.

The inhabitants of the commune are known as Anosiens or Anosiennes

Geography
Anos is located some 15 km north-east of Pau and 10 km south-east of Auriac. Access to the commune is by road D39 from Morlaas in the south passing north through the commune and the village and continuing north to join the D834 just north of Astis. Several other country roads also pass through the commune.

The Lau river forms the western border of the commune with the eastern shore of the Lake of Saint-Amour (also called the Lake of Anos) forming the part just west of the village. The Lau flows north to join the Luy de France which also forms the eastern border of the commune.

Historical Localities and hamlets

Guilhem
Guillaumet
Guiraut
Jouannes
Lartigue
Peyré
Peys
Puyau
Tachoères

Toponymy
The commune name in Béarnais is Anòs (according to the classical norm of Occitan).

Brigitte Jobbé-Duval indicates that Anos could be of Gallic origin being the name of the property owner Andus plus the suffix -ossu with a proposed meaning of "Domain of Andus".

The name Anos was mentioned in 1243 in the Titles of Ossau and in the Cassini map in 1750).

History
Paul Raymond noted on page 6 of the 1863 dictionary that in the 14th century Anos belonged to the community of Preachers of Morlaàs.

The commune was part of the archdeaconry of Vic-Bihl which depended on the diocese of Lescar of which Lembeye was the capital.

Administration

List of Successive Mayors

Inter-communality
Anos is part of five inter-communal structures:
The Communauté de communes du Nord-Est Béarn;
The SIVU for the maintenance of roads, parks and buildings in Barinque;
The AEP association for the Regions of Luy and Gabas;
The Energy association of Pyrénées-Atlantiques;
The iner-communal association for irrigation of Anos - Saint-Armou.

Demography
In 2017 the commune had 192 inhabitants.

Culture and Heritage

Civil heritage
The Maison Tachoères farmhouse (1768) is registered as an historical monument.
Other Houses and Farms (18th-19th century) are also registered as historical monuments.

Religious heritage
The Parish Church of Saint-Laurent (11th century) is registered as an historical monument.

Environmental heritage
An artificial lake called Lake Saint-Armou or Lake of Anos is on the border between the two communes.

See also
Communes of the Pyrénées-Atlantiques department

References

External links
Anos on the 1750 Cassini Map

Communes of Pyrénées-Atlantiques